Zinc finger FYVE domain-containing protein 1 is a protein that in humans is encoded by the ZFYVE1 gene.

The FYVE domain mediates the recruitment of proteins involved in membrane trafficking and cell signaling to phosphatidylinositol 3-phosphate (PtdIns(3)P)-containing membranes. This gene encodes a protein which contains two zinc-binding FYVE domains in tandem. This protein displays a predominantly Golgi, endoplasmic reticulum and vesicular distribution.
Alternatively spliced transcript variants have been found for this gene, and they encode two isoforms with different sizes.

References

Further reading